Galium virgatum, common name southwestern bedstraw, is a North American species of plants in the Rubiaceae. It is native to the south-central part of the United States, primarily in the southern Great Plains from Texas to Missouri, but with scattered populations as far east as South Carolina.

References

External links
Photo of herbarium specimen at Missouri Botanical Garden, collected in Missouri in 1992, Galium virgatum
United States Department of Agriculture plant profile
Lady Bird Johnson Wildflower Center, University of Texas, Galium virgatum 
Gardening Europe

virgatum
Flora of the United States
Plants described in 1841